Willoughby may refer to:

Places

Antigua
Willoughby Bay (Antigua), on the southeast coast of Antigua

Australia
Willoughby, New South Wales, a suburb of Sydney
Willoughby Girls High School
City of Willoughby, a local government area of New South Wales
Electoral district of Willoughby, New South Wales
Parish of Willoughby, Cumberland, New South Wales
Willoughby, South Australia, a locality on Kangaroo Island
Cape Willoughby, a headland in South Australia

Canada
Willoughby, Langley, British Columbia, a community within the Township of Langley
Willoughby Township, Ontario

United Kingdom
Willoughby, Lincolnshire, a village
Willoughby railway station
Willoughby on the Wolds, Nottinghamshire 
Willoughby, Warwickshire, a village and civil parish
Willoughby Waterleys, Leicestershire

United States
Willoughby, Ohio, a city and a suburb of Cleveland
Willoughby, Albemarle County, Virginia, an unincorporated community
Willoughby Park, Friendship Heights, Washington, D.C.
Willoughby Run, a waterway in Adams County, Pennsylvania
Willoughby Spit, a peninsula in Norfolk, Virginia
Willoughby State Forest, Vermont
Lake Willoughby, Westmore, Vermont

Elsewhere
Willoughby's Land, elusive islands thought to be north of the Barents Sea

Hydronyms
Willoughby River, Vermont, United States

People
 Willoughby (surname), a list
 Willoughby (given name), a list

Fiction
 Willoughby (Looney Tunes), an animated character from Looney Tunes
 Inspector Willoughby, an animated character from The Woody Woodpecker Show
 John Willoughby, one of the main characters in Jane Austen's novel Sense and Sensibility
 The title character of the short-lived 1999 British sitcom Dr Willoughby
 Willoughby, Texas, a fictional town featured in Revolution (TV series)
 "A Stop at Willoughby", an episode from the first season of The Twilight Zone, which features a town called Willoughby
 A character in the novel Evelina by Fanny Burney
 A character in Celestina (novel) by Charlotte Smith
 The Willoughbys, a 2020 comedy film
 Violet Willoughby, the main character in the novel Haunting Violet

English/British titles
 Baron Willoughby de Broke, a barony by writ in the peerage of England since 1491
 Baron Willoughby de Eresby, a barony by writ in the peerage of England, dating to 1313
 Baron Willoughby of Parham, a title in the peerage of England from 1547 until 1779
 Willoughby baronets, four titles

Other uses
 , the name of more than one United States Navy ship
 Willoughby Delta 8, a twin-engined aerodynamic test bed for a proposed flying wing airliner

See also
 Willoughby East, New South Wales, Australia, a suburb of Sydney
 Willoughby on the Wolds, Nottinghamshire, England
 Willoughby Waterleys, Leicestershire, England
 Willoughby Hills, Ohio, U.S.